Robert Lee (born 12 October 1961) is an English professional golfer and television presenter.

Lee was born in London. He turned professional in 1982 and was in his prime from 1985 to 1987, finishing in the top thirty of the European Tour Order of Merit each of those years. He twice shot 27 for nine holes on the tour, first at the 1985 Monte Carlo Open, and again two years later at the 1987 Portuguese Open. He went on to win the latter, one of his two victories on the European Tour. He also seriously competed for the 1985 Open Championship in the opening rounds. He was in second place after the first round and only two back after the second round. He faded over the weekend but picked up a top-25 finish.

From the late 1980s Lee's form dipped, and he spent the latter half of the 1990s going back and forth between the second-tier Challenge Tour and the main European Tour. Since leaving the tour at the end of the 1999 season, Lee has worked as an analyst for Sky Sports.

Professional wins (5)

European Tour wins (2)

Note: The 1987 Portuguese Open was shortened to 54 holes due to weather.

European Tour playoff record (1–0)

Challenge Tour wins (2)

Challenge Tour playoff record (0–1)

Other wins (1)

Results in major championships

Note: Lee only played in The Open Championship.

CUT = missed the half-way cut
"T" = tied

References

External links

English male golfers
European Tour golfers
Golfers from London
People from Walton-on-Thames
1961 births
Living people